Deathchase is a 1983 vehicular combat game written for the ZX Spectrum by Mervyn Estcourt and published by Micromega in the UK. In Spain it was published by Ventamatic. It is commonly known by the incorrect name of "3D Deathchase", perhaps due to the prominent "3D" on the inlay, and that some magazines incorrectly referred to this title. Timex USA obtained the rights to distribute Deathchase for its range of computers in the US. They rebranded the game Cyclepath but it was a commercial failure.

Gameplay

The player controls a motorcycle-riding mercenary as he pursues two other motorcycles, one blue and one yellow, through a forest. Each enemy motorcycle destroyed is worth $1000 (i.e. points) to the player. The player's motorcycle is equipped with forward-firing guns with which to shoot its quarry. The projectiles can be controlled mid-flight simply by steering the bike. If both enemy motorcycles are destroyed, the player moves to a night version of the same level. If both enemy motorcycles on that level are destroyed, the player moves on to a daytime level of the next stage (with more trees to avoid). There are also tanks and helicopters which appear on the horizon and can be shot for bonus points.

The game takes place over eight stages. When stage eight is completed, the game returns to the start.

Reception
It received a positive reaction from the gaming press, garnering praise for what was then an advanced form of 3D gameplay. A contemporary review in the ZX Spectrum gaming magazine CRASH described Deathchase as "an extremely simple idea for a game, and utterly compelling to play" and awarded the game 92%. In 1992 it was nominated as the best Spectrum game ever in the magazine Your Sinclair.  Both CRASH and Your Sinclair referred to the game as "3D Deathchase"

Legacy
Andrew Leyden's remake, Death Chase 2002 was highlighted in Edge magazine's retro special. It was described as "pleasant enough" but lacking the feel of the original.

References

External links

ZX Spectrum games
ZX Spectrum-only games
1983 video games
Vehicular combat games
Video games developed in the United Kingdom
Video games set in forests